"Ode to Liberty" is a poem written by Alexander Pushkin. Upon graduation from the Lycee, Pushkin publicly recited the poem, one of several that led to his exile by Tsar Alexander the First.

Authorities summoned Pushkin to Moscow after the poem was found among the belongings of the rebels from the Decembrist Uprising (1825).

References

Russian poetry
Alexander Pushkin
1800s poems